Edna is a city in Labette County, Kansas, United States.  As of the 2020 census, the population of the city was 388.

History
The first store in Edna opened in 1876.  The first post office in Edna was established in April 1878. The town of Edna was platted in the summer of 1886 when the railroad was extended to that point.

Edna was named in 1876 for a child, Edna Gragory.

The Edna Public Library opened in 1950.

Geography
Edna is located at  (37.059524, -95.358583).

Climate
The climate in this area is characterized by hot, humid summers and generally mild to cool winters.  According to the Köppen Climate Classification system, Edna has a humid subtropical climate, abbreviated "Cfa" on climate maps.

Demographics

2010 census
As of the census of 2010, there were 442 people, 183 households, and 122 families residing in the city. The racial makeup of the city was 88.7% White, 3.4% Native American, 0.9% from other races, and 7.0% from two or more races. Hispanic or Latino of any race were 2.3% of the population.

There were 183 households, of which 33.3% had children under the age of 18 living with them, 53.6% were married couples living together, 10.9% had a female householder with no husband present, 2.2% had a male householder with no wife present, and 33.3% were non-families. 32.2% of all households were made up of individuals, and 18.1% had someone living alone who was 65 years of age or older. The average household size was 2.42 and the average family size was 3.04.

The median age in the city was 39.7 years. 25.3% of residents were under the age of 18; 10.2% were between the ages of 18 and 24; 19.8% were from 25 to 44; 27.3% were from 45 to 64; and 17.4% were 65 years of age or older. The gender makeup of the city was 49.1% male and 50.9% female.

2000 census
As of the census of 2000, there were 423 people, 191 households, and 123 families residing in the city. The racial makeup of the city was 90.07% White, 0.24% African American, 5.20% Native American, 0.24% Asian, 0.47% from other races, and 3.78% from two or more races. Hispanic or Latino of any race were 0.95% of the population.

There were 191 households, out of which 28.8% had children under the age of 18 living with them, 47.6% were married couples living together, 13.1% had a female householder with no husband present, and 35.6% were non-families. 34.0% of all households were made up of individuals, and 25.1% had someone living alone who was 65 years of age or older. The average household size was 2.21 and the average family size was 2.79.

In the city, the population was spread out, with 27.9% under the age of 18, 4.0% from 18 to 24, 23.4% from 25 to 44, 21.7% from 45 to 64, and 22.9% who were 65 years of age or older. The median age was 42 years. For every 100 females, there were 79.2 males. For every 100 females age 18 and over, there were 77.3 males.

The median income for a household in the city was $27,250, and the median income for a family was $34,205. Males had a median income of $28,438 versus $21,563 for females. The per capita income for the city was $18,694. About 1.7% of families and 6.3% of the population were below the poverty line, including 5.2% of those under age 18 and 18.1% of those age 65 or over.

Education
The community is served by Labette County USD 506 public school district.

Edna High School was closed through school unification. The Edna High School mascot was Pirates.

References

Further reading

External links
 City of Edna
 Edna - Directory of Public Officials
 Edna city map, KDOT

Cities in Kansas
Cities in Labette County, Kansas